The judiciary of New Zealand is responsible for the system of courts that interprets and applies the laws of New Zealand. It has four primary functions: to provide a mechanism for dispute resolution; to deliver authoritative rulings on the meaning and application of legislation; to develop case law; and to uphold the rule of law, personal liberty and human rights. The judiciary is supported in its work by an executive department, the Ministry of Justice.

The court system has four levels: the six-member Supreme Court is the highest court; the ten-member Court of Appeal hears appeals from the High Court on points of law; the High Court deals with serious criminal offences and civil matters, and hears appeals from the lower courts; and the District Court, which meets in fifty-eight locations. There is also a separate Māori Land Court and Māori Appellate Court which have jurisdiction over Māori land cases under the Te Ture Whenua Maori Act 1993.

Court hierarchy

The Supreme Court sits at the apex of the New Zealand court hierarchy as the final appellate court. Cases may only go to the Supreme Court if it grants "leave to appeal". It generally hears appeals of considerable public interest, commercial significance, substantial miscarriages of justice or significant issues relating to the Treaty of Waitangi. The chief justice presides over the Supreme Court and is described in the Senior Courts Act 2016 as "senior to all other judges". Before the Supreme Court first met in 2004, the Privy Council in London served as the highest court.

The High Court and Court of Appeal are subordinate appellate courts. The High Court is also the highest court of first instance, primarily hearing complex cases or those cases which exceed the lower courts' jurisdiction. This includes all criminal trials for murder, manslaughter and treason. The District Court hears more than 95% of all criminal trials. The Family Court and Youth Court are specialist divisions of District Court, dealing with families and young people, respectively. Other specialist courts include: the Employment Court; the Environment Court; the Māori Land Court; the Māori Appellate Court; and disputes tribunals, which are small claims courts. The Waitangi Tribunal is a permanent commission of inquiry established under the Treaty of Waitangi Act 1975.

Law

New Zealand practices the common law legal system, where the decisions of higher courts constitute binding precedent upon courts of equal or lower status within their jurisdiction, as opposed to the civil law legal system in the continental Europe.

The laws of New Zealand are based on English law, some older statutes of the British Parliament (notably the Bill of Rights 1689), statutes of the New Zealand Parliament, and decisions of the New Zealand courts. The laws are based on three related principles: parliamentary sovereignty, the rule of law, and the separation of powers. In interpreting common law, New Zealand judges have followed British decisions, although they are not bound by them, thereby preserving uniformity with British common law, bolstered by the long-term role of the Privy Council.

Judges
The chief justice is formally appointed by the governor-general on the recommendation of the prime minister. The judges of the Māori Land Court are appointed by the governor-general on the recommendation of the minister for Māori Development. All other superior court judges are appointed by the governor-general on the advice of the attorney-general, the chief justice, and the solicitor-general collectively.

Judges and judicial officers are appointed non-politically and under strict rules regarding tenure to help maintain judicial independence from the executive government. Judges are appointed according to their qualifications, personal qualities, and relevant experience. New Zealand does not have a judicial appointments commission as in many other democracies. As for removal from the bench, judges have only rarely been removed from the bench in New Zealand. A judge may not be removed from office except by the attorney-general upon an address of the House of Representatives (Parliament) for proved misbehaviour. 

Judges of the Supreme Court, Court of Appeal and High Court are titled "Justice", while those of lower courts are titled "Judge". The title "Justice" is abbreviated, however "Judge" is not. For example, a judge of the High Court would be referred to as Venning J, whereas a judge of the District Court would be referred to as Judge Neave. Judges in New Zealand are addressed as "Your Honour" or "Sir/Madam". 

In Commonwealth tradition, New Zealand judges do not use gavels. Instead, a judge raises his or her voice (or stands up if necessary) to restore order in the courtroom.

Languages used in court
In addition to English, Te Reo Māori and New Zealand Sign Language are official languages of New Zealand. Either official language may be used by any person or in any pleading or process in or issuing from a court. Any party wishing to do so must notify the court 10 working days in advance to ensure an interpreter is available, or the court will be adjourned until an interpreter can be found and the party may be liable for costs of the adjournment and delay.

History
A Supreme Court was first established in 1841 followed by various lower courts including District Courts and Magistrates' Courts, with the latter coming into being in 1846. The Court of Appeal was set up in 1862 as the highest court in New Zealand, but consisted of panels of judges from the Supreme Court. Appeals could be taken from the Court of Appeal to the Privy Council. The District Courts were abolished in 1925 but later re-established. In 1957 the Court of Appeal was fully separated from the Supreme Court, by having its own judges.

The Native Land Court was established in 1865 under the Native Lands Act, to "define the land rights of Māori people under Māori custom and to translate those rights or customary titles into land titles recognisable under European law". The court was criticised for enabling the removal of Māori from their land, partly due to holding proceedings in English and in cities far from Māori settlements, judges with inadequate knowledge of Māori custom, and partly due to the laws it enforced. Land law did not recognise that land was owned communally by hapū (clans), and land ownership was put in the hands of a few people. In 1954 it was renamed the Māori Land Court. In the 1980s the judiciary played a major role in redefining and elevating the constitutional position of the Treaty of Waitangi.

In 1980, the Supreme Court was renamed the High Court (as it called today), reflecting its intermediate role. In October 2003, Parliament passed the Supreme Court Act 2003, establishing a new Supreme Court of New Zealand in Wellington in July 2004, and simultaneously ending the right of appeal to the Privy Council. The Privy Council dealt with only a small number of appeals annually and was shared with some other Commonwealth nations; the new Supreme Court allows for a quicker appeals process as more cases are heard. In October 2016, the Senior Courts Act consolidated in a single statute the Judicature Act of 1908 and the Supreme Court Act, which were repealed.

Indigenous courts

In Australia, Canada, New Zealand, and the United States, Indigenous peoples are over-represented in the prison population. There have been calls to increase measures to reduce the level of incarceration in New Zealand, based on principles of therapeutic jurisprudence and restorative justice, and similar to specialist courts and processes for Indigenous peoples in Canada and Australia.

Te Kooti Rangatahi is an Indigenous court for young Māori people, based on the marae, and has shown some success.  Māori culture (tikanga Māori) and community members are integrated with the existing judicial process, to help young offenders connect with their culture.

Te Kooti Matariki, the Matariki Court, is an Indigenous court for adults within a mainstream court system, under the District Court of New Zealand and operating under the Sentencing Act 2002. Based in Kaikohe, Northland Region, this court incorporates Māori customs and culture.  Some of these differences from mainstream courts include including the offender's family in court proceedings; seating the offender at the same level as the judge and prosecutor; and a Kaumātua (elder) helps to determine the court proceedings, which begin with welcome speeches. By incorporating tikanga, more information is forthcoming from family members, with the collective knowledge of an offender's whanau (extended family) providing far more information than in formal court proceedings. The offender’s iwi (nation), hapū (clan) and whānau may all help to create an appropriate rehabilitation program for the offender, which, upon successful completion, will be taken into account in the final sentence.
A 2011 article by Joanna Hess suggested that New Zealand should adopt some of the practices of Australian Indigenous courts, in particular the Koori Court in the state of Victoria, which has  Indigenous sentencing courts as a separate division of the local court system.

See also

Judicial review in New Zealand
Law enforcement in New Zealand
Sheriffs in New Zealand
Constitution of New Zealand
Ministry of Justice (New Zealand)
Politics of New Zealand

References

Further reading

External links
Courts of New Zealand

 
Government of New Zealand